The White and Thompson No. 3 was a British flying boat of the First World War.  While the prototype was originally designed to compete in an air-race around the UK, eight more similar aircraft were built for the Royal Naval Air Service.

Development and design
In 1914, the White and Thompson Company Limited of Bognor Regis, England, who had become exclusive licence holders for Curtiss flying boats for Great Britain the previous year, decided to build two different flying boats: a single-engine and a larger twin-engine machine. They were set to compete in the Daily Mail £5,000 Circuit of Britain race for seaplanes, scheduled to start on 10 August that year.

The first to be completed was the single-engine machine, designated the White and Thompson No. 2 Flying Boat. This was a two-bay, uneven-span pusher biplane powered by a 120 hp (90 kW) Beardmore-built Austro Daimler engine mounted between the upper and lower wings.  Its hull, the construction of which was subcontracted to S. E. Saunders, was of copper sewn mahogany (or Consuta) over a wooden frame and carried a crew of two in a side-by-side cockpit. It first flew on 1 August 1914, but was impressed by the Royal Naval Air Service owing to the situation in Europe, with Britain declaring war with Germany on 4 August.

An order for eight similar flying boats followed, designated White and Thompson No.3. These had rounded wingtips and a larger tail fin, and had the central fin surface that was mounted above the upper wing centre-section on the prototype replaced by two smaller surfaces above the wings. The production aircraft were powered by a 120 hp Beardmore engine, although one aircraft was fitted with a 150 hp (112 kW) Hispano-Suiza.

Operational history
The prototype, fitted with bomb-racks, proved reliable and popular, and was operated by the RNAS until being wrecked in June 1915. The first production aircraft was delivered to No. 1 Squadron RNAS on 7 February 1915. The No. 3 flying boats, which could be fitted with a Lewis gun on the port side of the cockpit were used for anti-submarine patrols from various bases both in the United Kingdom and France (with one force landing in the Netherlands and being interned) and latterly for training.

Operators

Royal Naval Air Service
No.1 Squadron RNAS

Specifications of prototype

See also

Footnotes

References

Bibliography
Bruce, J. M. British Aeroplanes 1914–18. London:Putnam, 1957.
Goodall, Michael H. The Norman Thompson File. Tunbridge Wells, UK: Air-Britain, 1995. .

London, Peter. "Island Pioneers; Aircraft Production Origins on the Isle of Wight". Air Enthusiast, No. 56, Winter 1994. Stamford, UK:Key Publishing. . pp. 71–77.
London, Peter. "Bognor's Boats: The Aircraft of Norman Thompson". Air Enthusiast, No. 66, November–December 1996. Stamford, UK:Key Publishing. . pp. 70–75.
Thetford, Owen. British Naval Aircraft since 1912. London:Putnam, Fourth edition, 1978. .

Further reading
"The Royal Aero Club of the United Kingdom: Official Notices to Members",  Flight, 17 July 1914, p. 731.
"Testing the White and Thompson Flying Boat".  Flight, 7 August 1914, p. 834.
"The "Round Britain" Machines". Flight, 11 September 1914, pp. 933–935.
"The "Round Britain" Machines". Flight, 9 October 1914, pp. 1014–1016.

External links

1910s British sport aircraft
Flying boats
Single-engined pusher aircraft
N.T.4
Biplanes
Aircraft first flown in 1914